Streptartemon glaber is a species of air-breathing land snail, terrestrial pulmonate gastropod mollusk in the family Streptaxidae. 

Subspecies
 Streptartemon glaber aroae (H. B. Baker, 1925)
 Streptartemon glaber glaber (L. Pfeiffer, 1850)
 Streptartemon glaber normalis (Jousseaume, 1889)

Distribution 
The distribution of Streptartemon glaber includes:
 Puerto Rico
 U.S. Virgin Islands
 Saint Thomas
 Saint Croix
 Dominica - The effect of this introduced, carnivorous species on the native Dominican malacofauna is undocumented as yet.
 Barbados
 Trinidad
 Tobago
 Venezuela
 Guyana
 Suriname
 Brazil

References
This article incorporates CC-BY-3.0 text from the reference.

 Charles, L. (2016). Inventaire de mollusques terrestres de Guadeloupe, Petites Antilles: données préliminaires. Journal MalaCo. 12: 47-56.
 Breure, A. S. H., Hovestadt, A., Fields, A. & Robinson, D. G. (2016). The land Mollusca (Gastropoda) of Saint Kitts and Nevis (Lesser Antilles), with description of a new species. The Nautilus. 130(2): 27-52.

External links
 Pfeiffer, L. (1850). Descriptions of twenty-four new species of Helicea, from the collection of H. Cuming, Esq. Proceedings of the Zoological Society of London. 17 (197-198)
 conchyliologica 57.pdf Hovestadt A. & Neckheim C. M. (2020). A critical checklist of the non-marine molluscs of St. Martin, with notes on the terrestrial malacofauna of Anguilla and Saint-Barthélemy, and the description of a new subspecies. Folia Conchyliologica. 57: 1-38.

Streptaxidae
Gastropods described in 1849